Greg Solano (born November 15, 1963), a Democrat, was elected Sheriff of Santa Fe County, New Mexico in 2002, after leaving the Santa Fe City Police Department as a sergeant. Solano ran unsuccessfully for Lieutenant Governor of New Mexico in the 2010 Primary election under the Democratic party. Solano served nearly eight years as sheriff before resigning 1 month before his term was to end. On November 29, 2016 Greg Solano was in the news again when he donated a kidney to Retired District Judge Michael Vigil who was suffering from kidney failure .

Personal life
Greg Solano was born November 15, 1963 in Santa Fe, NM. Greg Solano was married Antoinette Solano on May 19, 1984, they have two children and six grandchildren. Antoinette was a former employee of the State of New Mexico. Antoinette and Greg worked together in the Self Storage industry. On June 24, 2021 Antoinette passed away from a heart attack. Antoinette Solano Obituary Greg Solano is also a prolific woodworker using CNC, Wood Turning, and traditional furniture making in his art  .

Political career
Solano was a former President of the Santa Fe Police Officers Association, the City Police Union. During his presidency, the union became the first certified and recognized City of Santa Fe Union. He lost re-election as president in 1994 after Mayor Debbie Jaramillo appointed a controversial black police chief Don Grady. He was caught in between union members who wanted the chief removed and those who felt the fight for removal was racist in nature. He lost the election to the pro removal faction. He then left the police department in 1994 and first ran for sheriff in 1998, losing to then Under Sheriff Ray Sisneros by a slim margin.

In 2002, Solano ran again for sheriff against a field of two other Democrats and one Republican. After winning a close primary in June, he went on to win 70% of the vote in the November general election.

As sheriff, he raised deputy pay by 21% and in doing so stopped a flood of deputies leaving for other departments as well as filling often-vacant positions. Solano took on the privatization of jails in Santa Fe County after the problem-plagued jails formerly run by private companies received widespread criticism. He fought for the adult and juvenile jails return to public control ending the counties association with private companies. The fight over removing private companies from running the jail created conflict with the County Commission who was leary of government control of the jail and juvenile facilities. After the county took control of the jail and juvenile facility the Commission voted to remove the Sheriff's Office from having any authority over running the jail and juvenile facilities. He was involved in a settlement agreement with the United States Department of Justice over complaints and deficiencies found in audits of the adult facility prior to his administration. Sheriff Solano also took on drunk driving issues when he fought for local ordinances allowing for the taking and auctioning of repeat offenders automobiles and the placement of breath test machines in local liquor establishments. The most controversial of his driving while intoxicated ideas was to place the information and photos of repeat offenders on the Sheriff's Office website. Sheriff Solano later expressed regret over passing legislation to seize vehicles of drunk drivers after the city attempted to seize one of his vehicles when his daughter was arrested in the vehicle. Solano fought the seizure in district court and the City of Santa Fe returned the vehicle when it appeared the city might lose the case. The City of Santa Fe was in fear that if Solano would win the case the entire seizure program could be ruled illegal and rather than face the possibility of losing the program all together the city attorney dismissed the seizure case.

In September 2005, Solano announced his re-election bid for the office of Sheriff in the June 2006 Democratic Primary. The Santa Fe Reporter wrote a cover story on his life called "Behind the Badge " which was published May 3, 2006.

In June 2006 Sheriff Solano handily won re-election with 64% of the vote. He was challenged by one of his deputies who ran an increasingly negative campaign which failed to garner enough support to remove Sheriff Solano from office. Sheriff Solano begins his second four-year term January 1, 2007 having no Republican opponent in the General Election. The Sheriff's office is term limited with only two consecutive four year terms allowed.

On August 27, 2008 Sheriff Solano announced he would run for Lieutenant Governor of New Mexico in the 2010 Primary election under the Democratic party. In January 2010 Solano dropped his bid for Lieutenant Governor citing fundraising difficulties .

Resignation/Embezzlement
On November 24, 2010 Democrat Solano resigned as Sheriff of Santa Fe County after admitting to selling police and county property for years, including protective body armor vests to members of the military using eBay.

"I have done some things that I should not have done and am ready to come clean and face the consequences," Greg Solano, sheriff of Santa Fe county, said in a statement.

Solano, saying his family faced financial difficulties, admitted selling property that included cell phones, flashlights, police belts, holsters and the protective vests.

"During the last few years I have taken these vests and sold them online, mostly to military personnel who wanted them for extra protection overseas," Solano said. "This was wrong, illegal, unethical and dishonest."

Solano said the body vests he sold were several years old and no longer recommended for use by law enforcement.

State police said they have been investigating an embezzlement charge against Solano for the past four months.

State police spokesman Eric Garcia said the amount of property sold by Solano had not yet been determined. But he said "the scheme was facilitated through EBay where Solano would sell items illegally."

He said police investigators are working with the local district attorney's office and the case is ongoing.

Solano said he has turned over evidence and promised to cooperate with authorities.

"I will accept the consequences for my actions. Although my home is threatened with foreclosure and I am now unemployed, I plan to pay back what I took," Solano said.

Solano was praised in the media for the way he handled the scandal and for taking immediate responsibility saving taxpayer dollars and resources in the investigation and prosecution .

Robert Garcia, Solano's undersheriff was sworn in as interim County Sheriff. Garcia was subsequently elected as Sheriff by the citizens of Santa Fe County in the election of November 2, 2011 and began his first term on January 1, 2012.

On July 20, 2011, Solano pleaded guilty in District Court as part of a plea agreement to five counts of fraud for embezzling county property and selling the items for his own gain on eBay.  The plea deal came eight months after Solano resigned as sheriff and admitted auctioning the items for personal profit. Solano was sentenced to 3 months in jail and $25,000 restitution as well as 5 years probation. Solano was released from jail after 6 weeks with good time. Solano successfully finished his probation in 2016.

Kidney Donation
In November 2016 Solano again made local news headlines when he donated a kidney to retired District Court Judge Michael Vigil. Solano said he had known the Judge since he was 20 years old and Judge Vigil helped him gain custody of his siblings. Greg Solano's Mother died when Solano was 20 years old and when Solano needed an attorney to legally gain custody of his 3 siblings Judge Vigil, then an attorney represented Solano on a Pro Bono basis. Thirty years later in 2015 Solano found out his old attorney, now a retired judge needed a kidney Solano called and offered one of his. Approximately 40 people offered and tested to donate the kidney. Solano was the only match. The testing and preparation took approximately a year and in November 2016 for during the thanksgiving holiday the former sheriff donated his kidney in a double surgery at the Mayo Clinic in Phoenix Arizona. While a few said Solano may be trying to redeem himself in the public eye, Solano said his criminal conviction and the kidney donation were unrelated. "He's a good man," he said of Vigil a day after he'd been released from the hospital. "I did it for that reason and that reason only. Not to, like, fix my appearance with the community or anything like that."

Social media
Solano is net savvy (he's known as the "Blogging Sheriff"). Solano maintains an active presence on Twitter and Facebook and regularly engages with his thousands of followers.

Writing
Greg Solano is also a writer with his short story "From Baghdad to Santa Fe " winning second place in a local writing contest earning him the title of published author. He began work on his first fiction novel in 2005.

References

External links
Lt. Governor Political Campaign Blog

Santa Fe Sheriff's Office

1963 births
New Mexico sheriffs
Living people
Politicians from Santa Fe, New Mexico
New Mexico Democrats